Carmen Phipps (born 9 October 1927) is a Jamaican athlete. She competed in the women's high jump at the 1948 Summer Olympics.

References

1927 births
Living people
Athletes (track and field) at the 1948 Summer Olympics
Jamaican female high jumpers
Olympic athletes of Jamaica
Sportspeople from Kingston, Jamaica
Central American and Caribbean Games gold medalists for Jamaica
Competitors at the 1946 Central American and Caribbean Games
Central American and Caribbean Games medalists in athletics
20th-century Jamaican women
21st-century Jamaican women